The Montreal Force are a professional ice hockey team in the Premier Hockey Federation (PHF). They are based in Montreal, Quebec and practice at the Verdun Auditorium. The team was established in 2022 and debuted in the 2022–23 PHF season.

History
Montreal was long planned as a location for a PHF expansion franchise, but uncertainties due to the then-ongoing COVID-19 pandemic led the league to delay such plans. An expansion franchise was announced by the league in July 2022, with the owners announced as BTM Partners, which also owns three other PHF teams. The team's name, logo and jersey were revealed in a press release from the league the following month.

Three uniforms will be used during the inaugural season, one jersey maroon with white stripes, one black with maroon stripes, and one white with maroon stripes, all with fleur-de-lis shoulder patches.

The team announced in September 2022 that Peter Smith would be the team's first head coach, with Pierre Alain as associate coach and Katia Clement-Heydra as assistant coach.

The team's first goal was scored in its inaugural match (a 5-4 shootout win against the Buffalo Beauts) by captain Ann-Sophie Bettez.

Team

Current roster
 

Coaching staff and team personnel
 Head coach: Peter Smith
 Associate coach: Pierre Alain
 Assistant coach: Katia Clement-Heydra

Front office

 President: Kevin Raphaël
 Vice president: Emmanuel Anderson De Serres
 Ownership group: BTM Partners

References

External links

  
  

Montreal Force
Force
Ice hockey clubs established in 2022
Premier Hockey Federation teams
Women's ice hockey teams in Canada
2022 establishments in Quebec